Kenneth Acker (born February 6, 1992) is a former American football defensive back. He was originally drafted by the San Francisco 49ers in the sixth round of the 2014 NFL Draft. He played college football at Southern Methodist University.

College career
Acker started out at Southern Methodist University, playing football as a freshman in 2010. He remained in SMU until 2013, when he graduated as a Senior and entered the 2014 NFL Draft. During his time at SMU, Acker made 128 tackles, 31 assisted tackles, 6 interceptions, and scored a defensive touchdown. His most successful year was his Junior year in 2012, when he made the Top 10 in the Conference USA for punt return yards, interceptions, interception return yards, interception return touchdowns, and passes defended.

Professional career

San Francisco 49ers
Acker was drafted by the San Francisco 49ers in the sixth round of the 2014 NFL Draft, before signing a four-year contract with the 49ers. He played during the pre-season, and impressed during the game against the Denver Broncos, drawing an offensive penalty, knocked away a pass, and even made an interception, only for it to be called back due to a penalty. Acker played through the pre-season with a stress fracture in his left foot, and was placed on injured reserve shortly after the diagnosis.

After a strong preseason in 2015, Acker was given the starting cornerback job shortly before the 49ers regular season opener against the Minnesota Vikings.  Acker was on the field for a team high 56 defensive snaps in a 20-3 49ers victory.
Through Week 14, Acker had impressed in his starting role, having amassed 3 interceptions (tied for the team lead), 8 pass deflections and 58 solo tackles.
  He lost his starting job that week to Dontae Johnson.

Kansas City Chiefs
On August 27, 2016, Acker was traded to the Kansas City Chiefs for an undisclosed draft pick.

Indianapolis Colts
On April 11, 2018, Acker signed with the Indianapolis Colts. He was released on May 15, 2018.

Jacksonville Jaguars
On August 11, 2018, Acker signed with the Jacksonville Jaguars. He was placed on injured reserve on September 1, 2018. He was released on September 8, 2018.

Saskatchewan Roughriders
On January 29, 2021, Acker signed with the Saskatchewan Roughriders. He was released on July 16, 2021.

References

External links
Saskatchewan Roughriders bio

Living people
1992 births
Players of American football from Portland, Oregon
American football cornerbacks
SMU Mustangs football players
San Francisco 49ers players
Kansas City Chiefs players
Indianapolis Colts players
Jacksonville Jaguars players
Saskatchewan Roughriders players